Gordan Jandroković (born 2 August 1967) is a Croatian diplomat and politician serving as Speaker of the Croatian Parliament since 2017. He previously served as Minister of Foreign Affairs and European Integration from 2008 to 2011, and as Deputy Prime Minister from 2010 to 2011 in the cabinets of prime ministers Ivo Sanader and Jadranka Kosor.

Born in Bjelovar, Jandroković graduated from the Zagreb Faculty of Civil Engineering in 1991 and obtained a diploma from the Faculty of Political Sciences in 1993.

Political career 
Jandroković was elected a member of the Croatian Parliament for six consecutive times: in parliamentary elections in 2003, 2007, 2011, 2015, 2016 and 2020. 

During his parliamentary career, Jandroković, among other functions, served as the chairman of the Committee on the Economy, Development and Renovation from 2003 to 2004, and as the chairman of the Foreign Policy Committee from 2004 to 2007. In the same period he served as the chairman of the Delegation to the Croatia – EU Joint Parliamentary Committee. In the 7th term of the Croatian Parliament, from 2011 to 2015, Jandroković was the deputy chairman firstly of the European Integration Committee and then of the European Affairs Committee, founded upon Croatia’s entry into the European Union. He was elected the chairman of the European Affairs Committee on 23 January 2016. Following the extraordinary parliamentary elections in September 2016, he was elected the Deputy Speaker of the Croatian Parliament on 14 October 2016.

As per a post-election agreement, set up in 2016, between the two parties in the governing coalition: the Croatian Democratic Union (HDZ; led by Prime Minister Andrej Plenković) and the Bridge of Independent Lists (Most; led by Božo Petrov, who would later be elected speaker of Parliament), Jandroković was supposed assume the speakership some time in 2018 (the middle of the current legislative term, due to end in 2020). However, due to the breakup of the coalition between the HDZ and the Most, Božo Petrov resigned as speaker on 4 May 2017, while Jandroković was voted into office as the new speaker the day later. Jandroković was re-elected as speaker on 22 July 2020 following the 2020 election.

References 

 

1967 births
Living people
People from Bjelovar
Representatives in the modern Croatian Parliament
Croatian Democratic Union politicians
Croatian diplomats
University of Zagreb alumni
Faculty of Political Sciences, University of Zagreb alumni
Foreign ministers of Croatia
Speakers of the Croatian Parliament